Dongping is a town in Ruyuan Yao Autonomous County, Guangdong, China.

Administrative division
As of 2016, the town is divided into one community and ten villages: 
 Longhu Community
 Dongtian
 Changxi
 Xin
 Chaping
 Xiazhai
 Nanshui
 Fangwu
 Tangpen
 Longxi
 Tixia

History
In 1983, it was known as Dongping District. In 1986, it was renamed "Dongping Township". In 1994, it was upgraded to a town. In 2005, Longnan was merged into the town.

Geography
The town sits at the northwestern Ruyuan Yao Autonomous County. The town shares a border with Luoyang Town to the west, the towns of Bibei and Youxi to the east, Daqiao Town to the north, and Rucheng Town to the south.

The South Water Lake is located in the town. It is the third largest lake in Guangdong. The lake provides drinking water and water for irrigation.

Economy
The local economy is primarily based upon agriculture and local industry. The main crops of the region are rice, followed by peanut and vegetables.

Demographics

As of 2018, the National Bureau of Statistics of China estimates the township's population now to be 12,914.

Tourist attractions
The South Water Lake is a popular attraction. The lake provides an attractive setting for many outdoor activities, including fishing, pleasure boating, and hiking.

Transportation
The National Highway G323 winds through the town.

References

Bibliography

 

Divisions of Ruyuan Yao Autonomous County